Yaksha is the name of several rural localities in Russia:
Yaksha, Komi Republic, a settlement in Yaksha Rural-Type Settlement Administrative Territory of Troitsko-Pechorsky District in the Komi Republic; 
Yaksha, Kostroma Oblast, a settlement in Petrovskoye Settlement of Chukhlomsky District in Kostroma Oblast;